Calvinist confessions of faith are the confessions of faith of various Calvinist churches. These documents express consensus on doctrine for the church adopting the confession. A few confessions are shared as subordinate standards (i.e. authorities subordinate to the Bible) by many denominations, which have made their choices from among the various creeds for primarily historical reasons. Some of the common Calvinist confessions are (with year of writing):

Continental Reformed

Presbyterian
Scots Confession (1560) 
The Westminster Standards are common among the Presbyterian churches:
Westminster Confession of Faith (1646)
Westminster Shorter Catechism (1649)
Westminster Larger Catechism (1649)
Confession of 1967
The Book of Confessions (1983) contains the confessional standards of the Presbyterian Church (USA), and incorporates versions of both Continental and Presbyterian confessions of faith, including the 1991 Brief Statement of Faith.

Congregationalist
The Independents declined from Calvinist theology on issues of the role of the magistrate, and the powers of higher church courts, but retained the Calvinist system touching many other issues.
Cambridge Platform (1648), Massachusetts Bay Colony, New England
 Savoy Declaration (1658), London
Saybrook Platform (1708), Connecticut Colony, New England

Baptist
Some of the Baptist churches came alongside the Puritan movement in England, and in doing so sought to agree as far as conscience allowed, in the Calvinistic form of doctrine which prevailed among the Presbyterians and many Congregationalists. Except for their few exceptions concerning congregational church governance and adult baptism, these "Particular" Baptists adopted the Calvinist faith. 
1644 Baptist Confession of Faith
Keach's Catechism (1677)
1689 Baptist Confession of Faith
New Hampshire Confession of Faith
Baptist Affirmation of Faith 1966

Anglican
The Anglican church is not a confessional church in the same way that the Lutheran Church is. Anglican doctrine is most defined by Lex orandi, lex credendi ("the law of praying [is] the law of believing"). 
 Thirty-Nine Articles
 Lambeth Articles
 Irish Articles 1615
 The Westminster Confession of Faith (1646) is originally an Anglican confession of faith.

Methodist

The "Confession of Faith of the Calvinistic Methodists or the Presbyterians of Wales" was adopted at the Associations of
Aberystwyth and Bala in the year 1823.

References

 
Calvinist texts
Huguenots